The Biak threespot crow (Euploea tripunctata) is a species of nymphalid butterfly in the Danainae subfamily. It is endemic to Indonesia.

References

Euploea
Butterflies of Indonesia
Endemic fauna of the Biak–Numfoor rain forests
Butterflies described in 1915
Taxonomy articles created by Polbot